"Palahniuk's Laughter" is the debut single by English band Fightstar, released as a promotional video in January 2005.

It is featured on their debut extended play, They Liked You Better When You Were Dead and is the first song on the UK version of the EP. The title is a reference to author Chuck Palahniuk, while the song was originally called "Out Swimming in the Flood" but the title was changed out of respect after the tsunami in Asia on 26 December 2004. A video was made for the song to promote the release of the EP and received heavy rotation at the time on Kerrang!. The video was directed by the band's bassist Dan Haigh.

Video
The video for "Palahniuk's Laughter" is the band playing in heavy rain in a post-apocalyptic future. Near the end of the video water rises from the ground before smashing back down. Then the band's instruments catch fire.

External links
 Official video on YouTube

References

2004 songs
2005 debut singles
Fightstar songs
Songs written by Charlie Simpson
Songs written by Alex Westaway
Songs about writers